James Hutchinson VC (9 July 1895 – 22 January 1972) was an English recipient of the Victoria Cross, the highest and most prestigious award for gallantry in the face of the enemy that can be awarded to British and Commonwealth forces.  He was serving with the British Army during the First World War at the time of the award.

Hutchinson was 20 years old, and a private in the 2/5th Battalion, The Lancashire Fusiliers (55th (West Lancashire) Division), British Army on 28 June 1916 when his actions in Ficheux, France earned him the Victoria Cross. His citation reads:

He later achieved the rank of corporal.

References

Location of grave and VC medal (Devonshire)
 

1895 births
1972 deaths
People from Radcliffe, Greater Manchester
British World War I recipients of the Victoria Cross
Lancashire Fusiliers soldiers
British Army personnel of World War I
British Army recipients of the Victoria Cross
Military personnel from Lancashire